Francesca Guardigli (born 10 April 1973) is a former Sammarinese tennis player. She won a total of five ITF doubles titles during her career and on 5 May 1997 reached a doubles ranking high of world number 234.

In May 1997, Guardigli played ten rubbers for the San Marino Fed Cup team for an overall personal record of 5–5.

ITF finals (5–2)

Singles (0–1)

Doubles (5–1)

Fed Cup participation

References

External links 
 
 
 

1973 births
Living people
Sammarinese female tennis players